Lia Lewis Gribius (born 1996 or 1997) is an English freestyle football competitor and association football global ambassador who was raised in France. Having trained in dance most of her youth, she took up freestyle football in her 20s and became a world champion.

Background
According to her talent agency profile, Lewis was born in London and raised in the Brittany region of France. Since her mother wanted to raise bilingual children, she moved with her parents, Stéphane, a businessman, and Karen (née Lewis) Gribius, an interior designer, to Baden near the Gulf of Morbihan in 2001. She has two siblings, Emily and Alexander. Her maternal grandparents are Irish (grandmother) and Welsh (grandfather).

Career
Growing up, Lewis never participated in any sports involving a ball. She studied ballet and contemporary dance for 18 years. After struggling to make it in the dance world, she left the Conservatoire of Ballet and Contemporary in London at age 21 and switched to freestyle football in 2018. In 2020, she finished fourth in the Red Bull Street Style Freestyle Football World Championship. In January 2021, Vanity Fair dubbed her freestyle football's rising star. In August 2021, Lewis was runner-up to Aguśka Mnich in the 2021 Super Ball tournament. In November 2021, London-based Lewis, who represents the United Kingdom during international competitions, became the Red Bull Street Style Freestyle Football World Champion. In 2022, she won a Freestyle World Championship and partnered with Supa Strikas for a YouTube series. In February 2023, she became an ambassador/spokesperson for the 2023 FIFA Women's World Cup as the dedicated skills coach of its World Cup Trophy Tour, that will visit all 32 participating nations.

Notes

External links
2021 World Championship Video
2021 Super Ball
Video from Red Bull

1990s births
Living people
English sportswomen
Freestyle footballers
Sportspeople from Brittany
Sportspeople from London